Valentine Pontifex is a novel by Robert Silverberg published in 1983.

Plot summary
Valentine Pontifex is a novel in which the Metamorphs try to drive people from their native world Majipoor by spreading ecological problems.

Reception
Dave Langford reviewed Valentine Pontifex for White Dwarf #56, and stated that "Readers will remain in any agony of suspense unless they've cheated by reading the book's title. Not many surprises, then; but if you liked the previous two you probably won't be disappointed."

Reviews
Review by Debbie Notkin (1983) in Locus, #274 November 1983
Review by Darrell Schweitzer (1984) in Science Fiction Review, Spring 1984
Review [French] by Élisabeth Vonarburg (1984) in Solaris, #56
Review by Ken Lake (1984) in Vector 122
Review by Tom Easton (1985) in Analog Science Fiction/Science Fact, June 1985

References

External links
 

1983 American novels
1983 science fiction novels
American science fiction novels
Novels by Robert Silverberg